Ophir Energy plc was an oil and gas exploration and production company based in London. It owned both operating and non-operating assets in Africa, Asia, and Mexico.

History 
The company was founded by Alan Stein and Jonathan Taylor in 2004 with backing from Tokyo Sexwale. It was listed on the London Stock Exchange in July 2011. In March 2014, Ophir Energy sold its 20% stake in its Tanzanian assets for around $1.2 billion to Pavilion Energy.

On 2 March 2015 Ophir Energy purchased Salamander Energy.

In 2017, the company conducted massive layoffs with addition to restructure the organization due to harsh market conditions.

In 2018, Ophir has agreed to acquire a package of Southeast Asian assets from Santos Limited, an Australian listed Oil & Gas company for a total of $205 million. The portfolio of assets includes producing assets in Vietnam and Indonesia plus exploration assets in Malaysia and Bangladesh. The Transaction is in line with Ophir’s stated strategy of rebalancing its portfolio towards a larger production and cash flow base to support the refocused exploration portfolio.

In May 2019, Ophir was acquired by MedcoEnergi in a deal valued at £408.4 million ($517.6 million). This step further reflected Ophir's previous objective to be more focused on Asian Producing Assets as well as minimizing exposure to high risk exploration portfolios. The acquisition has made the expanded company one of the largest independent E&P company in South East Asia.

Operations
The company owns Fortuna Floating Liquified Natural Gas project in Equatorial Guinea, the first of its kind in Africa which is due to produce its first gas in 2020.  In Tanzania, it participates in the planned LNG project together with Tanzanian Government through  Tanzania Petroleum Development Corporation,  BG Group (a division of Royal Dutch Shell), Statoil, and Exxon Mobil.

References

External links
 

Companies based in the City of Westminster
Non-renewable resource companies established in 2004
Oil companies of the United Kingdom
Companies listed on the London Stock Exchange
2011 initial public offerings
Defunct oil and gas companies of the United Kingdom